Darrell Lance Abbott, best known as Dimebag Darrell, was an American guitarist and songwriter, best known as a member of heavy metal band Pantera. His musical recordings and film appearances include:

Under his name
1996: Supercop Soundtrack – "Caged in a Rage" (lead vocals and guitars)
2006: DimeVision Vol.1: That's the Fun I Have (DVD, footage compiled posthumously by Vinnie Paul Abbott)
2010: Metal Hammer CD May 2010 – "Dime's Blackout Society" (lead vocals and guitars, previously unreleased track released on the free CD with the May 2010's issue of Metal Hammer magazine)
2012: "Twisted" (lead vocals and guitars, previously unreleased track released with the introduction of Elephant Brand Skateboards' Dimebag tribute skateboard)
2014: "Whiskey Road" (all instruments and vocals, previously unreleased song tracked in 2001 on the Reinventing the Steel Tour in the US)
2017: Dimevision Vol. 2: Roll with It or Get Rolled Over
2017: The Hitz (EP)

Pantera
1983: Metal Magic (first independent full album)
1984: Projects in the Jungle (second independent full album)
1985: The Hot 'n Heavy Home Vid (first independent home video with original lineup)
1985: I Am the Night (third independent full album)
1988: Power Metal (fourth independent full album)
1989: Cowboys from Hell Demos (demo tape for the first major label release Cowboys from Hell)
1990: Cowboys from Hell (first major label full album)
1991: Cowboys from Hell: The Videos (first home video)
1992: A Not So Vulgar Display of Power (seven-track in-store sampler CD)
1992: Hostile Mixes (four-track promo CD and 12" vinyl)
1992: For Those About to Rock: Monsters in Moscow (film)
1992: Vulgar Display of Power (second major label full album)
1992: Buffy the Vampire Slayer: Original Motion Picture Soundtrack – "Light Comes Out of Black" (with Rob Halford)
1993: Vulgar Video (second home video)
1993: Walk, Walk Biomechanical, Walk Cervical, and Walk Live Material (EPs)
1994: Driven Downunder Tour '94 Souvenir Collection (box set of three CD's and a booklet)
1994: Hostile Moments (EP)
1994: Far Beyond Driven (third major label full album)
1994: Alive and Hostile EP (five-track live CD)
1994: The Crow: Original Motion Picture Soundtrack – "The Badge" (Poison Idea cover)
1995: Demon Knight: Original Motion Picture Soundtrack – "Cemetery Gates (Demon Knight Edit)"
1996: The Great Southern Trendkill (fourth major label full album)
1996: The Singles 1991–1996 (six-CD box set)
1996: Becoming (six-track live EP; Japanese title 'Nosatsu Live')
1997: 3 Watch It Go (third home video) 
1997: Official Live: 101 Proof (first live album)
1998: Live (three-track promo CD)
1998: Strangeland: Original Motion Picture Soundtrack – "Where You Come From"
1999: Detroit Rock City: Original Motion Picture Soundtrack – "Cat Scratch Fever" (Ted Nugent cover)
1999: 3 for One (box set of the first three major label albums)
2000: Heavy Metal 2000 – "Immortally Insane"
2000: Nativity in Black II: A Tribute to Black Sabbath – "Electric Funeral" (Black Sabbath cover)
2000: 3 Vulgar Videos from Hell (all three home videos released together on DVD)
2000: Sampler (three-track sampler CD)
2000: Unofficial Hits (sampler CD)
2000: Reinventing the Steel (fifth major label full album)
2000: Dracula 2000 soundtrack – "Avoid the Light"
2001: Extreme Steel Plus (seven-track EP)
2001: Revolution Is My Name (single/EP)
2001: SpongeBob SquarePants: Original Theme Highlights – "Pre-Hibernation" (instrumental)
2003: Dallas Stars: Greatest Hits – "Puck Off" (short song recorded for the Dallas Stars icehockey team)
2003: The Best of Pantera: Far Beyond the Great Southern Cowboys' Vulgar Hits! (first best-of CD including DVD)
2006: HiFive (five-track EP)
2008: 2in1 Pantera (second and third major albums released as a double CD)
2010: 1990–2000: A Decade of Domination (second best-of CD)

Damageplan
2004: New Found Power

Rebel Meets Rebel
2006: Rebel Meets Rebel (lead guitar and backing vocals)

Hellyeah
2016: Unden!able – "I Don't Care Anymore" (Phil Collins cover; guitar parts)

With Vinnie Paul
1996: Spacewalk: A Tribute to Ace Frehley – "Fractured Mirror" (Ace Frehley cover; lead guitars)
1997: Return of the Comet: A Tribute to Ace Frehley – "Snowblind" (Ace Frehley cover; lead vocals and guitars)

With Philip Anselmo and Sean Yseult
1992: "Dawn of the Horrible Gorilla" (lead guitar and drum machine)

Anthrax
1995: Stomp 442 – "Kingsize" (guitar solo) and "Riding Shotgun" (guitar solo)
1998: Volume 8: The Threat Is Real – "Inside Out" (guitar solo) and "Born Again Idiot" (guitar solo)
2003: We've Come for You All – "Strap It On" (guitar solo) and "Cadillac Rock Box" (spoken word intro and guitar solo)

Drowning Pool
2002: Sinema (DVD, 2002, interview and footage compiler)

Godsmack
2002: Smack This! (DVD, 2002; backstage footage and live material; cut from final DVD)

King Diamond
1998: Voodoo – "Voodoo" (guitar solo)

Nickelback
2003: The Long Road international edition – "Saturday Night's Alright for Fighting" (Elton John cover)
2003: Charlie's Angels: Full Throttle – "Saturday Night's Alright for Fighting" (Elton John cover)
2005: All the Right Reasons – "Side of a Bullet" (guitar solo composed posthumously from Vulgar Display of Power and Far Beyond Driven outtakes)
2008: Gotta Be Somebody (single) – "Saturday Night's Alright for Fighting" (Elton John cover)

Scum Scunge
2003: Five Bucks Ain't Shit – "Believe" (guitar solo), "How Many Times" (guitar solo), and "Abuse" (guitar solo)
2005: Just a Taste EP – "Abuse" (guitar solo)

Tres Diablos
1998: ECW: Extreme Music – "Heard It on the X" (ZZ Top cover; lead vocals and guitar)

With Doug Pinnick
"Born Under a Bad Sign" (Cream cover; lead guitar)

With Throbbin' Donnie Rodd
"Country Western Transvestite Whore" (lead vocals and guitar)

With Sebastian Bach
2000: Randy Rhoads Tribute – "Believer" (Ozzy Osbourne cover; lead guitar)

References

External links
Official Damageplan website 
Official Pantera website
Official Rebel Meets Rebel website

Pantera
Heavy metal discographies